Antioch Colony is an unincorporated community in Hays County, Texas on Old Black Colony Road between Farm roads 967 and 1626, northwest of Buda, TX.

History
Antioch Colony was founded by former slaves in 1870. About a dozen families purchased land from Joseph F. Rowley and established a farming community, raising cows and horses, and planting corn, sugarcane and cotton. In 1874, Elias and Clarisa Bunton donated land for a school and a two-story schoolhouse was built. The school was in use until 1961, when the Buda schools were desegregated.

Antioch Colony was an active farm community through the 1950s when residents moved to cities for work. In the 1970s former residents began to return re-establishing the community.

In 1997 the Antioch Community Church was built on the site of the original schoolhouse, and in 2011 a community effort led to the placement of a historical marker also at this location.

References

External links
 
 The Antioch Colony
 Artifacts, descendants tell story of freed slaves in Texas
 Antioch Colony
 Ransom and Sarah Williams Farmstead
 Antioch Colony Archaeological Field School
 

Unincorporated communities in Texas
Populated places in Texas established by African Americans
1870 establishments in Texas
Ethnic enclaves in Texas
African-American history of Texas